Grigol Chabradze (born 20 April 1996) is a Georgian footballer who plays as a defender for Dinamo Batumi and the Georgia national team.

Career
Chabradze made his international debut for Georgia on 25 March 2021 in a 2022 FIFA World Cup qualification match against Sweden.

Career statistics

International

References

External links
 

1996 births
Living people
Footballers from Georgia (country)
Georgia (country) youth international footballers
Georgia (country) under-21 international footballers
Georgia (country) international footballers
Association football defenders
FC Saburtalo Tbilisi players
FC Telavi players
FC Dinamo Batumi players
Erovnuli Liga players
Erovnuli Liga 2 players